The 1963 Campeonato Paulista de Futebol da Divisão Especial de Profissionais, organized by the Federação Paulista de Futebol, was the 62nd season of São Paulo's top professional football league. Palmeiras won the title for the 14th time. Jabaquara was relegated and the top scorer was Santos's Pelé with 22 goals.

Championship
The championship was disputed in a double-round robin system, with the team with the most points winning the title and the team with the fewest points being relegated.

Top Scores

References

Campeonato Paulista seasons
Paulista